Sodium silicide (NaSi, Na4Si4) is a binary inorganic compound consisting of sodium and silicon. It is a solid black or grey crystalline material.

Sodium silicide reacts readily with water yielding gaseous hydrogen and aqueous sodium silicate in an exothermic reaction (~175 kJ·mol−1):
 2 NaSi + 5 H2O → 5 H2 + Na2Si2O5

This is used in hydrogen technologies to generate hydrogen as a fuel. And is also used as high energy dense storage for hydrogen under low pressure.

See also 
 Silicide
 Binary compounds of silicon

External links 
 SiGNa Chemistry, Inc.

References 

Silicides
Sodium compounds